The 2002 WNBA Season was the Women's National Basketball Association's sixth season. The season ended with the Los Angeles Sparks winning their second WNBA championship.

Regular season standings
Eastern Conference

Western Conference

Season award winners

Playoffs

Coaches

Eastern Conference
Charlotte Sting: Anne Donovan
Cleveland Rockers: Dan Hughes
Detroit Shock: Greg Williams and Bill Laimbeer
Indiana Fever: Nell Fortner
Miami Sol: Ron Rothstein
New York Liberty: Richie Adubato
Orlando Miracle: Dee Brown
Washington Mystics: Marianne Stanley

Western Conference
Houston Comets: Van Chancellor
Los Angeles Sparks: Michael Cooper
Minnesota Lynx: Brian Agler and Heidi VanDerveer
Phoenix Mercury: Cynthia Cooper and Linda Sharp
Portland Fire: Linda Hargrove
Sacramento Monarchs: Maura McHugh
Seattle Storm: Lin Dunn
Utah Starzz: Candi Harvey

External links
2002 WNBA Final Standings
2002 WNBA Awards
2002 WNBA Playoffs

 
2002 in American women's basketball
2002–03 in American basketball by league
2001–02 in American basketball by league
Women's National Basketball Association seasons